Queen Charlotte: A Bridgerton Story is an upcoming historical drama limited series created by Shonda Rhimes for Netflix. The series is a prequel spin-off of the Netflix series Bridgerton, and will focus on young Queen Charlotte's rise to prominence and power. The series will premiere on May 4, 2023, and consists of six episodes.

Cast and characters 
 Golda Rosheuvel as Queen Charlotte, the Queen of the United Kingdom
 India Amarteifio as young Queen Charlotte
 Adjoa Andoh as Lady Danbury, a sharp-tongued, insightful doyenne of London society
 Arsema Thomas as young Lady Danbury
 Ruth Gemmell as Violet, Dowager Viscountess Bridgerton, mother of the Bridgerton children
 Connie Jenkins-Greig as young Violet Ledger
 Hugh Sachs as Brimsley, the Queen's gossip-mongering secretary
 Sam Clemmett as young Brimsley
 Michelle Fairley as Princess Augusta
 Corey Mylchreest as young King George III
 Richard Cunningham as Lord Bute
 Tunji Kasim as Adolphus
 Rob Maloney as the Royal Doctor
 Cyril Nri as Lord Danbury
 Katie Brayben as Vivian Ledger, Violet's mother
 Keir Charles as Lord Ledger, Violet's father
 Freddie Dennis as Reynolds

Episodes

Production

Development 
The series was announced in May 2021, with Shonda Rhimes set as showrunner and writer. Rhimes also serves as executive producer with Betsy Beers and director Tom Verica. Anna O'Malley serves as producer. The series consists of eight episodes. In April 2022, production designer Dave Arrowsmith was fired due to allegations of bullying on set.

Casting 
On March 30, 2022, Golda Rosheuvel, Adjoa Andoh, Ruth Gemmell, and Hugh Sachs were announced to be reprising their roles from Bridgerton. India Amarteifio, Michelle Fairley, Corey Mylchreest, Arsema Thomas, Sam Clemmett, Richard Cunningham, Tunji Kasim, Rob Maloney, and Cyril Nri were also cast. In June 2022, Katie Brayben and Keir Charles were cast in recurring roles. One month later, Connie Jenkins-Grieg joined the cast as a young Violet Bridgerton.

Filming 
The series was previously set to begin filming in January 2022. Production began on February 6, 2022, under the working title Jewels, and was set to wrap in May 2022. Director Tom Verica confirmed filming had started by March 28, 2022. The series wrapped on August 30, 2022.

Release 
Queen Charlotte: A Bridgerton Story is scheduled to be released on Netflix on May 4, 2023, and consists of six episodes.

References

External links 
 
 

2020s American drama television miniseries
2020s American romance television series

Alternate history television series
American prequel television series
American romantic drama television series
Bridgerton
Charlotte of Mecklenburg-Strelitz
Cultural depictions of George III
Television series by Shondaland
English-language Netflix original programming
Television series set in the 18th century
Television shows based on American novels
Upcoming drama television series
Upcoming Netflix original programming